Oegoconia ariadne is a moth of the family Autostichidae. It is found on Crete and the Dodecanese and Aegean islands.

References

Moths described in 1988
Oegoconia
Moths of Europe